The basilar artery is one of the arteries that supplies the brain with oxygen-rich blood.

The two vertebral arteries and the basilar artery are known as the vertebral basilar system, which supplies blood to the posterior part of the circle of Willis and joins with blood supplied to the anterior part of the circle of Willis from the internal carotid arteries.

Structure
The basilar artery arises from the union of the two vertebral arteries at the junction between the medulla oblongata and the pons between the abducens nerves (CN VI).

The diameter of the basilar artery range from 1.5 to 6.6 mm.

It ascends superiorly in the basilar sulcus of the ventral pons and divides at the junction of the midbrain and pons into the posterior cerebral arteries.

Its branches from caudal to rostral include:

anterior inferior cerebellar artery
labyrinthine artery (<15% of people, usually branches from the anterior inferior cerebellar artery)
pontine arteries
superior cerebellar artery

Clinical relevance 
A basilar artery stroke classically leads to locked-in syndrome.

Additional images

References

External links

 Basilar Artery at neuroangio.org
  - "Cranial Fossae: Arteries, Inferior Surface of the Brain"
 Blood supply at neuropat.dote.hu
 
 

Arteries of the head and neck